The following is a list of FCC-licensed radio stations in the U.S. state of South Carolina, which can be sorted by their call signs, frequencies, cities of license, licensees, and programming formats.

List of radio stations

Defunct
 WAGL
 WAGS
 WBAW (AM)
 WBAW-FM
 WBSC
 WCSE (AM)
 WDAB
 WDKD
 WDOG
 WFIS (AM)
 WHSC
 WJDJ
 WJES
 WKMG
 WKSC
 WLCM
 WLMA
 WNMI-LP
 WPCO
 WSCM-LP
 WWPZ-LP
 WYLA-LP
 WYLI-LP
 WZKQ-LP

See also
 South Carolina media
 List of newspapers in South Carolina
 List of television stations in South Carolina
 Media of locales in South Carolina: Charleston, Columbia, Greenville

References

Bibliography

External links

  (Directory ceased in 2017)
 South Carolina Broadcasters Association
 Carolinas Chapter of the Antique Wireless Association

Images

 
South Carolina
Radio